New Hamburg Historical Area is a national historic district located at Delaware Township, Mercer County, Pennsylvania. The district includes 1 contributing building, 4 contributing sites, and 1 contributing structure. It includes the site of the Hamburg Iron Furnace (1846), railroad bed, Shenango Division of the Erie Extension Canal loading bay, grist mill and millrace, remains of canal lock and towpath, and canal official's dwelling.

It was added to the National Register of Historic Places in 1974.

References

Historic districts on the National Register of Historic Places in Pennsylvania
Buildings and structures in Mercer County, Pennsylvania
National Register of Historic Places in Mercer County, Pennsylvania
1974 establishments in Pennsylvania